KZSZ (107.5 FM, "La Zeta") is a commercial radio station located in Colusa, California, broadcasting a Spanish contemporary hit radio format to the Chico, California, Sacramento, Woodland and Yuba City markets in California, on 107.5 FM in Chico.

As KQPT, the station previously had a modern adult contemporary music format branded as "107.5 The Point" until March 21, 2011, when it became the principal Top 40/CHR station in the Chico/Yuba City radio market from Sacramento north. Following that, it aired a Top 40 (CHR) format branded as "107.5 Now FM", until flipping to its current format on August 1, 2019, following the station's acquisition by Bustos Media. On June 30, 2021, 107.9 K300AD and KZSZ HD2 broke from its La Zeta simulcast and flipped to Spanish rhythmic as "107.9 Urbana".

References

External links

Contemporary hit radio stations in the United States
ZSZ
Colusa, California
ZSZ
Radio stations established in 1987
1987 establishments in California